The Bear is an American comedy-drama television series created by Christopher Storer. It premiered on Hulu on June 23, 2022, and stars Jeremy Allen White, Ebon Moss-Bachrach, Ayo Edebiri, Lionel Boyce, Liza Colón-Zayas, and Abby Elliott. The series has received critical acclaim, with particular praise for the directing and performances of its cast. In July 2022, it was renewed for a second season, which is set to premiere in June 2023 and consist of 10 episodes.

The sandwich shop interior is copied from the real-life Chicago shop Mr. Beef on Orleans, in River North. The creator was a frequent patron and friends with the son of the owner.

For the first season, the series was nominated for Best Comedy Series at the Critics' Choice Awards and Golden Globe Awards. White won Best Actor in a Comedy Series at the Critics' Choice Television Awards, Golden Globe Awards, and Screen Actors Guild Awards. Additionally, Edebiri was nominated for Best Supporting Actress in a Comedy Series at the Critics' Choice Awards, while the series' ensemble cast was nominated for Outstanding Performance by an Ensemble in a Comedy Series at the Screen Actors Guild Awards.

Synopsis 
A young chef from the world of fine dining comes home to Chicago to run his family's Italian beef sandwich shop after the suicide of his older brother, who left behind debts, a rundown kitchen, and an unruly staff.

Cast

Main 
 Jeremy Allen White as Carmen "Carmy" Berzatto, an award-winning New York City chef de cuisine, who returns to his hometown of Chicago to run his late brother Michael's failing restaurant
 Ebon Moss-Bachrach as Richard "Richie" Jerimovich, the de facto manager of the restaurant and Michael's old best friend
 Ayo Edebiri as Sydney Adamu, a talented but inexperienced chef who joins The Beef as its new sous chef under Carmy
 Lionel Boyce as Marcus, The Beef's bread baker turned pastry chef, spurred on by Carmy's mentoring
 Liza Colón-Zayas as Tina, an acerbic and stubborn veteran line cook
 Abby Elliott as Natalie "Sugar" Berzatto, Carmy and Michael's younger sister and reluctant co-owner of The Beef

Recurring 
 Edwin Lee Gibson as Ebraheim, a veteran line cook at The Beef
 Matty Matheson as Neil Fak, a childhood friend of Carmy and Michael, and sometimes-handyman for the restaurant
 José Cervantes as Angel, a dishwasher at The Beef
 Oliver Platt as Jimmy Cicero, uncle of the Berzatto siblings and major investor in the restaurant
 Corey Hendrix as Gary, a line cook at The Beef
 Richard Esteras as Manny, a dishwasher at The Beef
 Chris Witaske as Pete, Sugar's earnest husband, generally disliked by everyone

Guest stars 
 Jon Bernthal as Michael "Mikey" Berzatto, Carmy and Sugar's late brother, who died by suicide via gunshot four months before the events of the series
 Joel McHale as Carmy's old executive chef in New York City, who was abusive and dismissive
 Amy Morton as Nancy Chore, a scrupulous health inspector
 Molly Ringwald as the meeting moderator of the Al-Anon meetings that Carmy attends

Episodes

Release
The Bear premiered on Hulu in the United States on June 23, 2022. It is available internationally in the Star hub on Disney+.

The 10-episode second season is set to premiere in June 2023.

Music
The Bear has a soundtrack of 1980s, 1990s, and 2000s alternative and mainstream rock classics, chosen by the show's creator Christopher Storer and executive producer Josh Senior. Some of the songs featured on the show include Chicago-based Wilco with "Spiders (Kidsmoke)", "Impossible Germany", and "Via Chicago", Radiohead's "Let Down", Van Morrison's "Saint Dominic's Preview", Pearl Jam's "Animal", Sufjan Stevens' "Chicago", John Mayer's "Last Train Home", Refused's "New Noise", The Breeders' "Saints", Counting Crows' "Have You Seen Me Lately?", Genesis' "In Too Deep", John Mellencamp's "Check It Out", and R.E.M.'s "Oh My Heart".

Reception

Audience viewership 
According to the streaming aggregator Reelgood, The Bear was the second most watched program across all platforms, during the week of July 13, 2022, the most watched program during the week of July 22, 2022, and the seventh most watched program during the week of July 27, 2022. According to the streaming aggregator JustWatch, The Bear was the second most streamed television series across all platforms in the United States, during the week ending July 3, 2022, and the second during the week ending July 17, 2022. FX announced that the series was the most watched comedy series in network history.

Critical response 
The review aggregator website Rotten Tomatoes reported an approval rating of 100% with an average rating of 8.7/10, based on 77 critic reviews. The website's critics consensus reads, "Like an expertly confected sandwich, The Bear assembles a perfect melange of ingredients and stacks them for optimal satisfaction—and thankfully keeps the crust-iness for extra flavor." Metacritic gave the series a weighted average score of 88 out of 100 based on 24 critic reviews, indicating "universal acclaim."

The American Film Institute named it one of the ten best television programs of the year. The Guardian named it number one of the best 100 TV shows of 2022 and described it as "the best workplace drama since Mad Men".

The Bear appeared in the top ten on numerous publications' "Best of 2022" lists, including first for The A.V. Club, BBC, People, and TVLine, among others.

Accolades

References

External links 
 The Bear at FX
 The Bear at Hulu
 

2020s American comedy-drama television series
2022 American television series debuts
English-language television shows
FX on Hulu original programming
Television series set in 2022
Television shows set in Chicago
Television series set in restaurants